The Treaty of Madrid (1880) was a collection of agreements between Morocco, under the rule of Hassan I, and many European powers, to give the powers the ownership of Moroccan lands they had seized, the resources present on these lands, settlement rights and to employ locals on these lands. This treaty served to regulate and make these conquests official in the international community.

Summary  
The treaty consisted of 18 articles:

Treaties/agreements signed previously, with Britain, Spain and France, remained in force, with modifications set out in this treaty. Foreign Officials residing in Morocco were given permission to employ Moroccans, and enjoyed 'protection', i.e. freedom from taxation, as did their families, their Moroccan employees and any Consulate employees who were Moroccan.  

Employees who worked as farmers, servants, interpreters or other menial jobs were not protected, even if they were not Moroccan. Any Foreign Nationals who owned farmed land or were farmers had to pay agricultural tax, and any who owned and used pack animals or load carrying had to pay 'gate tax', but in both situations foreign nationals were exempt from other taxes.

Foreign Officials could not employ soldiers or Moroccan Officials, or Moroccans undergoing criminal prosecution. Foreign Nationals could purchase or obtain land with the prior permission of the Moroccan Government, and as such the land would remain under Moroccan jurisdiction. Foreign Governments could choose any 12 Moroccans to be protected for whatever reason they desired without permission of the Moroccan Government, but had to seek permission if they wanted to protect any more.

The 1863 agreement with Morocco is summarized at the end of the Treaty.

Attendees

  Spain, represented by the President of the Council of Ministers Antonio Cánovas del Castillo.
  Morocco, represented by the Minister of Foreign Affairs Sid Mohamed Vargas.
  France, represented by the French Ambassador to Spain, Vice-Admiral Benjamin Jaurès.
  United Kingdom, represented by the Honorable Lionel Sackville-West, 2nd Baron Sackville.
  Austro-Hungarian Empire, represented by Count Emanuel Ludolf.
  United States, represented by General Lucius Fairchild. 
  Belgium, represented by Edward Anspach.
  Swedish-Norwegian Union, represented by resident minister Henry Åkerman.
  Kingdom of Denmark, represented by the United Kingdom.

See also
 Alaouite dynasty
 History of Morocco

References

1880s in Morocco
1880 in Africa
19th-century treaties